Mangifera pajang, commonly known as wild mango, is a species of tree in the family Anacardiaceae. It is endemic to Borneo, where it is known by the various native names: buah bambangan, buah mawang and buah embang.

Description 
It is a tall tree, which can grow up to 15 to 50 meters (50-164 feet) tall. The leaves are simple, oblong shaped (28 – 45 centimeters long and 10-15 centimeters wide) with petioles that are 5-7 centimeters long. The tree is not grown commercially and can be found in the forests in Sabah and Sarawak, Malaysia.

The flowers are elliptic-oblong and have 5 petals that are purplish-red on the inner surface and pinkish-white on the outside. 

The fruit is a fleshly drupe of globose shape measuring 15–20 cm across and has a rough skin, which is 5-7 millimeters thick. The wild mango fruits are green when unripe and change to a brown color when ripe. The flesh is yellow, thick and very fibrous. Wild mango flesh is aromatic and taste sweet and sour. The peel is very tough and has a corrosive latex layer. The latex is known to cause burns to lips and cause blisters.

References

pajang
Endemic flora of Borneo
Taxonomy articles created by Polbot
Taxa named by André Joseph Guillaume Henri Kostermans